The Sony α 350 (DSLR-A350) is a digital single-lens reflex camera (DSLR) being replaced from 2009 by the similarly specified Sony α 380. It features live view and body-integrated image stabilization.

Details
The Sony α 350 was introduced in Japan in March 2008. It has a 14.2 megapixel CCD sensor, the second highest pixel count for an APS-C format DSLR at the time of its launch, marginally exceeded by the Pentax K20D CMOS sensor.

The Live View is provided by a secondary low-resolution video sensor placed in the mirror-prism housing to provide a view of the focusing screen, which allows retention of phase-contrast autofocus. Live View is mechanically switched via a moving mirror surface. When Live View is active, the normal exposure metering is replaced by metering from the LV image itself offering many more zones or points, along with more accurate white balance. This system is shared with the Sony Alpha 300, a 10.2 megapixel variant.

References

External links

Specifications at sony.com
Announcement on DPReview

Reviews 
Sony Alpha 350 Review, David Kilpatrick, Photoclubalpha
Sony Alpha DSLR-A350 Review, April 2008, Michael J. McNamara, Popular Photography
Sony Alpha DSLR-A350 Review, Richard Butler, DPreview.com

350
Live-preview digital cameras
Digital cameras with CCD image sensor